Regina Lorraine Miller (born October 6, 1962) is the former head women's basketball coach at the University of Illinois at Chicago.  She previously served as the head women's basketball coach at UNLV from 1998 to 2008 and Western Illinois University from 1992 to 1998.

Head coaching record

Sources:,, and.

References

1962 births
Living people
American women's basketball coaches
American women's basketball players
Old Dominion Monarchs women's basketball players
Place of birth missing (living people)
UIC Flames women's basketball coaches
UNLV Lady Rebels basketball coaches
Western Kentucky University alumni